North Konawe Regency (Kabupaten Konawe Utara) is a regency of Southeast Sulawesi Province, Indonesia. It was formed in 2007 by splitting off seven of the northern districts of Konawe Regency to form a new North Konawe Regency (Kabupaten Konawe Utara). It is surrounded on all landward sides by the remaining area of the Konawe Regency, and covers an area of 5,101.76 km2. It had a population of 51,447 at the 2010 Census and 67,871 at the 2020 Census. The principal town lies at Asera.

Administration 
The North Konawe Regency was divided at the time of the 2010 Census into seven districts (kecamatan), but six additional districts have subsequently been created by division of the original districts. The districts are tabulated below with their populations at the 2010 Census and the 2020 Census. The table also includes the administrative centres of each district

Notes: (a) The 2010 population of Motui District is included in the figure for Sawa District, from which it was subsequently cut out. (b) the 2010 populations of Wawolesea and Lasolo Kepulauan Districts are included in the figure for Lasolo District, from which they were subsequently cut out. (c) the 2010 populations of Andowia and Oheo Districts are included in the figure for Asera District, from which they were subsequently cut out. (d) The 2010 population of Landawe District is included in the figure for Wiwirano District, from which it was subsequently cut out.

Wawolesea Karst
Wawolesea Karst is rare and unique, 80 kilometers north of Kendari or just 10 kilometers from Tanjung Taipa Beach. There are a 500-meter square pond several meters from the beach with altar and travertine columns which formed by salty water hot fountain. The salty water came from tunnels below sea level and the hot water with temperature between 35 and 45 Celsius degrees came from active tectonic. The hot sandy around them is suitable for Maleo birds to bury their eggs which will hatch by hot sandy temperature. Anoa as endemic animal can be found also in this area.

References

Regencies of Southeast Sulawesi